The 2022–23 Super50 Cup is an upcoming cricket tournament; it will be the 48th edition of the Super50 Cup, the domestic limited-overs cricket competition for the countries of the Cricket West Indies (CWI). The tournament is due to take place in October and November 2022 in Trinidad and Tobago.

The tournament will consist of eight teams: Barbados, Guyana, Jamaica, the Leeward Islands, Trinidad and Tobago, the Windward Islands, the Combined Campuses and Colleges, and a West Indies Emerging Team. The previous edition, which took place in February 2021, was won by Trinidad and Tobago. The teams will be split into 2 groups, with defending champions and hosts Trinidad and Tobago, Guyana, the Windward Islands and Combined Campuses and Colleges in Zone A, while Barbados, Jamaica, the Leeward Islands and West Indies Emerging Team will be in Zone B.

Squads 

Several teams named 15-player squads, including replacements for players who would be departing the tournament to represent the West Indies team in their series in Australia in November. However, after the early exit of the West Indies team from the 2022 T20 World Cup, teams were allowed to name an extended 18-player squad for the opening few fixtures, with West Indian internationals who were previously expected to be unavailable now free to be picked.

Fixtures 
Fixture times are local time (UTC-4).

Zone A

Zone B

Knockouts

Semi-finals

Final

References 

Super50
Regional Super50 seasons